The Beady Range is a subrange of the Stikine Ranges of mountains, located northeast of northern Dease Lake in northern British Columbia, Canada.

References

Beady Range in the Canadian Mountain Encyclopedia

Stikine Ranges
Mountain ranges of British Columbia